Sopela Women's Team is a professional cycling team based in Spain, which competes in elite road bicycle racing and track cycling events such as the UCI Women's World Tour and elite women's races.

Team history
On 7 October 2014, Fanny Riberot signed a contract extension. On 13 November, Evelyn García signed for the team. On 20 November the team signed a number of contract extensions with; Aurore Verhoeven, Mélodie Lesueur Sheyla Gutiérrez, Lucía González, Belen Lopez and Alicia González. On 24 November Soline Lamboley signed with the team. On 23 December Cristina Martínez signed for the team.

In February 2023, the team's rider, Estela Dominguez, was killed in a collision with a lorry at Villares de la Reina at the age of 19, while training at the beginning of her first year as a professional.

Team roster

Major results

2009
Overall Semaine Cantalienne, Fanny Riberot
Stage 2, Fanny Riberot
Trophée Fémina, Fanny Riberot
Ambierle, Fanny Riberot
Lyon Gerland, Fanny Riberot
Gruffy, Fanny Riberot

2010
Overall Semaine Cantalienne, Fanny Riberot
Stages 1 & 5, Fanny Riberot
Gran Premio San Isidro, Fanny Riberot
Prix des Fondateurs, Fanny Riberot

2011
 Road Race Championship of the Basque Country, Eneritz Iturriaga
Grenoble Technisud, Fanny Riberot
Overall Semaine Cantalienne, Fanny Riberot

2012
 Road Race Championship of Andalusia, Belén López
Zalla Road Race, Fanny Riberot
 Road Race Championship of Provence-Alpes-Côte d'Azur, Fanny Riberot
Charentonnay, Fanny Riberot
Trofeo Gobierno de La Rioja, Yulia Ilinykh
Campeonato de Euskadi, Yulia Ilinykh
Iurreta Road Race, Yulia Ilinykh

2013
Balmaseda Road Race, Eider Merino Cortazar
Campeonato de Navarra, Fanny Riberot

2014
 Youth classification Emakumeen Euskal Bira, Eider Merino Cortazar
Bembibre Copa de España, Eider Merino Cortazar
Urnieta (Campeonato de Euskadi), Alicia González Blanco
2015
 Overall Vuelta a Burgos Feminas, Belén López
Stage 1 (ITT), Belén López
Grand Prix de Plumelec-Morbihan Dames, Sheyla Gutiérrez
Cyclo-cross de Karrantza, Lucía González Blanco
Trofeo Ria de Marin, Eider Merino Cortazar
Balmaseda, Eider Merino Cortazar

2016
Trofeo Roldan (Copa de España), Gloria Rodríguez

2017
Busturia (Torneo Euskaldun), Alicia González Blanco
 Valencian rider classification Setmana Ciclista Valenciana, Cristina Martínez
 Overall Vuelta a Burgos, Eider Merino Cortazar
Stage 1, Eider Merino Cortazar
Bergara (Torneo Euskaldun), Eider Merino Cortazar
Berriatua (Torneo Euskaldun), Eider Merino Cortazar
Sarriguren (Torneo Euskaldun), Alicia González Blanco
Larrabasterra (Torneo Euskaldun), Gloria Rodríguez
 Overall Volta Ciclista Valencia Feminas, Alba Teruel Ribes
 Points classification, Alba Teruel Ribes
 Mountains classification, Gloria Rodríguez
 Sprints classification, Alicia González Blanco
 Youth classification, Alba Teruel Ribes
Team classification
Stage 1, Alba Teruel Ribes
Stage 2, Eider Merino
Stage 3, Cristina Martínez
Trofeo Roldan (Copa de España), Alicia González Blanco
 Time Trial Championship of Murcia, Gloria Rodríguez

2018
 Overall Vuelta a Burgos Feminas, Beatriu Gómez
Stage 1, Ziortza Isasi
Stage 3, Ariadna Trias
Circuito Jose Marquez, Soraia Silva
Palmela, Maria Martins
Vila Nova de Tazem Time Trial, Maria Martins

National champions

2009
 Spain Time Trial, Débora Gálvez Lopez
2010
 Spain U23 Cyclo-cross, Lucia González Blanco
2011
 Spain Time Trial, Eneritz Iturriaga Etxebarria
2012
 Spain Junior Mountainbike (XC), Lucia González
 Spain Track, (Team Pursuit), Irene Usabiaga
 Spain Track, (Points race), Irene Usabiaga
 Spain Track, (Scratch race), María del Mar Bonnin
2013
 Spain Cyclo-cross, Lucia González
2015
 El Salvador Time Trial, Evelyn García
 El Salvador Road Race, Evelyn García
 European U23 Track (Scratch race), Lucia González
2017
 Spain U23 Cyclo-cross, Alicia González
 Spain Track, (Points race), Cristina Martinez
 Spain Track, (Team Pursuit), Ziortza Isasi Cristobal
2018
 Portugal Track, (Points race), Maria Martins
 Portugal Track, (Scratch race), Maria Martins
 Portugal Track, (Omnium), Maria Martins
2019
 Portugal Track, (Omnium), Maria Martins
 Portugal Track, (Points race), Maria Martins
 Portugal Track, (Scratch race), Maria Martins
 Spain U23 Time Trial, Iurani Blanco

References

External links

Cycling teams based in Spain
UCI Women's Teams
Cycling teams established in 2009